The Jarrold Group is a Norwich–based company, founded as Jarrold & Sons Ltd, in 1770, by John Jarrold, at Woodbridge, Suffolk, before relocating to Norfolk in 1823. The Jarrold Group still involves members of the Jarrold family.

Family 
Of Huguenot ancestry, the Jerauld family arrived in Essex from France in the late 17th century. Samuel Jarrold served as Mayor of Colchester in 1723–24 and during the 18th century the Jarrolds expanded their mercantile ventures throughout East Anglia, becoming established in Norwich. The Jarrolds have joined City livery companies including the Stationers and Haberdashers.

(Herbert) John Jarrold CBE, Mayor of Norwich (1971–72), Peter Jarrold DL, Sheriff of Norwich (1999–2000), Caroline Jarrold DL.

Business
Primarily a retail business, Jarrolds department store in Norwich city centre, was designed by George John Skipper (1856–1948) between 1903 and 1905. Sir Nikolaus Pevsner describes the Jarrolds store as "baroque" in style. Jarrolds have several shops in Norwich, as well as in Wymondham and Cromer.

Non-retail divisions of the Jarrold Group of Companies include Jarrold Properties, Jarrold Training, and St James Facility Management.

Jarrolds sponsored the construction of a new stand at Norwich City F.C.'s Carrow Road football ground; known as The Jarrold Stand, the original sponsorship deal ceased in 2016.

Publishing activities
John Jarrold Jr. diversified the firm into publishing as early as 1823 and in 1877 it published the first edition of the children's classic, Anna Sewell's Black Beauty.

In 1936 the firm launched the Jarrolds' Jackdaw Library paperback book series and in 1939 the Jackdaw Crime Series.

Its activities previously included Jarrold Publishing and Jarrold Printing.

See also
 Julian Jarrold

References

External links
 jarrold.com
 Jarrold Publishing
 John Jarrold Printing Museum
 
 

Companies based in Norwich
1770 establishments in England
Department stores of the United Kingdom
Retail companies established in 1770
Book publishing companies of the United Kingdom
George Skipper buildings